Carlos Henrique Rodrigues do Nascimento (born 3 February 1974), also commonly known as Olívia, is a Brazilian former professional basketball player. With the senior Brazilian national basketball team, do Nascimento competed at the 1994 FIBA World Cup, and the 1996 Summer Olympics.

References

External links
 

1974 births
Living people
Brazilian men's basketball players
Olympic basketball players of Brazil
Basketball players at the 1996 Summer Olympics
Basketball players from Rio de Janeiro (city)
1994 FIBA World Championship players